The Hiding Place or Hiding Place may refer to:

Film
The Hiding Place (Playhouse 90), March 22, 1960 episode of American TV series; based on Robert Shaw's 1959 novel
The Hiding Place (film), 1975 American drama based on the 1971 book by Corrie ten Boom
The Hiding Place, 2000 American drama starring Kim Hunter and Timothy Bottoms, from the play by Mitch Giannunzio
The Hiding Place, 2008 American drama by Jeff Whitty

Literature
The Hiding Place, 1959 British novel by Robert Shaw
The Hiding Place (biography), 1971 memoir by Corrie ten Boom, who hid Dutch Jews during WWII
Hiding Place (Wideman novel), 1981 middle volume of "Homewood Trilogy" by American John Edgar Wideman 
The Hiding Place (Azzopardi novel), 2000 Welsh Booker Prize shortlist
The Hiding Place (Bell novel), 2012 American mystery

Music
Hiding Place (band), Scottish rock band, active from 2004 to 2007
Hiding Place (Selah album), 2004
Hiding Place (Don Moen album), 2006
Hiding Place (Tori Kelly album), 2018

See also
No Hiding Place, 1959–1967 British police detective TV series
Hiding Places, 2019 American album by Brooklyn rapper Billy Woods